Peter Brinsley is an Australian cricketer. He played five List A matches for South Australia between 1983 and 1985.

Brinsley's son Tom represented the Australian Under 19 and the South Australian Under 23 sides.

See also
 List of South Australian representative cricketers

References

External links
 

Year of birth missing (living people)
Living people
Australian cricketers
South Australia cricketers
Place of birth missing (living people)